Jari Markus Puikkonen (born 25 June 1959) is a Finnish former ski jumper.

Career
Puikkonen made his debut internationally in the Four Hills Tournament competition in Oberstdorf on 30 December 1977. He won his first World Cup victory at Innsbruck in 1981. That year he finished third overall in the Four Hills Tournament and he won three more victories in the ski jumping World Cup to finish fifth overall. He also won three medals at the Winter Olympics with a gold in the team large lill (1988 Winter Olympics), and bronze medals in both the individual normal hill (1984 Winter Olympics) and the individual large hill (1980 Winter Olympics).

Puikkonen's biggest successes were at the FIS Nordic World Ski Championships, where he won seven medals, including four golds (individual large hill: 1989, team large hill: 1984, 1985, 1989), two silvers (individual normal hill: 1982, individual large hill: 1985), and one bronze (team large hill: 1982). He also won a gold medal at the FIS Ski-Flying World Championships 1981.

Puikkonen retired after the 1990/91 season.

World Cup

Standings

Wins

References
 

1959 births
Living people
Sportspeople from Lahti
Finnish male ski jumpers
Olympic ski jumpers of Finland
Ski jumpers at the 1980 Winter Olympics
Ski jumpers at the 1984 Winter Olympics
Ski jumpers at the 1988 Winter Olympics
Olympic medalists in ski jumping
FIS Nordic World Ski Championships medalists in ski jumping
Medalists at the 1984 Winter Olympics
Medalists at the 1988 Winter Olympics
Medalists at the 1980 Winter Olympics
Olympic gold medalists for Finland
Olympic bronze medalists for Finland